Klugerella is a genus of bryozoans belonging to the family Cribrilinidae.

The species of this genus are found in the Americas, New Zealand, Malesia, near Antarctica.

Species:

Klugerella antarctica 
Klugerella aragoi 
Klugerella bifurca 
Klugerella gordoni 
Klugerella magnifica 
Klugerella marcusi 
Klugerella musica 
Klugerella olasoi 
Klugerella petasus

References

Bryozoan genera